was a Japanese group consisting of one member, volleyball player Motoko Obayashi, presumably chosen because of her height. She appears four times on the single cover to give the impression of a group with four members.  Although Deka Moni is not a part of Hello! Project, Tsunku produced the single, which features a cover of Minimoni's "Jankenpyon!" as its c/w track.

Single 
Released: August 7, 2001

Tracklist :

External links
 Entry on Tsunku's Official Site

Japanese pop music groups